Cove is a populated place situated in Apache County, Arizona, United States.

Education
The Red Mesa Unified School District operates Red Valley/Cove High School.

The Bureau of Indian Education (BIE) operates Cove Day School, a federal K-8 school for Native Americans. Additionally, the BIE operates Red Rock Day School, which takes students from the nearby area, in Red Valley.

References

Populated places in Apache County, Arizona